Kapitän der Träume is the seventh studio album released by Joachim Witt in 1992.  This marks the last album from Joachim Witt that features Neue Deutsche Welle.

Track listing
All tracks composed by Joachim Witt; except where noted.
 "Restlos"  "Complete" 
 "Durch die Strassen…"  "In the Streets"  (lyrics: Witt; music: Harald Gutowski)
 "Kapitän der Träume"  "Captain of Dreams" 
 "Trotzdem schön"  "Still Beautiful"  (Witt, Harald Gutowski, Annette Humpe)
 "In die falsche Welt Geboren"  "Born in the Wrong World" 
 "Bahia- Maria"
 "Nur mit Dir"  "Only with You" 
 "Hallo- Hallo"  "Hello- Hello"  (Witt, Harald Gutowski, Annette Humpe)
 "Nur mal so" (lyrics: Witt; music: Harald Gutowski)
 "Immer schlimmer"  "Worse"

Personnel
Joachim Witt - vocals, guitar, programming
Graham Laybourne, Harald Gutowski, Markus Schmidt, Uwe Ziegler - guitar
Harald Gutowski - bass
Annette Humpe, Graham Laybourne, Hans-Jörn Brandenburg - keyboards
Graham Laybourne, Harald Gutowski - programming
Martin Langer - drums
Joachim Witt, Jovanka von Willsdorf, Katrin Erichsen, Konstanze Arens, Susan Erichsen - choir

1992 albums
Joachim Witt albums